The 1990 McDonald's Open took place at Palau Sant Jordi, in Barcelona, Spain.

Participants

Games
All games were held at the Palau Sant Jordi in Barcelona, Spain.

Final standings

External links
NBA International Pre-Season and Regular-Season Games
List of champions at a-d-c

1990–91
1990–91 in American basketball
1990–91 in Italian basketball
1990–91 in Spanish basketball
1990–91 in Yugoslav basketball
International basketball competitions hosted by Spain
International basketball competitions hosted by Catalonia